Around the World may refer to:

 Circumnavigation, to navigate a circumference, as around the Earth

Books and publications
 Around the World (magazine), a Russian magazine

Film and TV
 Around the World (1943 film), a film starring Kay Kyser
 Around the World (1967 film), a Bollywood romantic comedy

Music
 Around the World (musical), a musical by Cole Porter
 Around the World (video), a concert DVD by Mariah Carey
 Around the World (1997 film), a documentary about the band Aqua

Albums
 Around the World (Ami Suzuki album), and the title song (see below)
 Around the World (Bad Boys Blue album)
 Around the World (Melo-M album)
 Around the World (Wilber Pan album)
 Around the World Live, a box set by Deep Purple

Songs
 "Around the World" (1956 song)
 "Around the World" (Ami Suzuki song)
 "Around the World" (Aqua song)
 "Around the World" (Christina Aguilera song)
 "Around the World" (Daft Punk song)
 "Around the World" (East 17 song)
 "Around the World" (Got7 song)
 "Around the World" (Natalie La Rose song)
 "Around the World" (Red Hot Chili Peppers song)
 "Around the World (La La La La La)", a song by ATC from Planet Pop and an international cover of Ruki Vverh!'s Pesenka
 "Around the World", by Kings of Leon from Walls
 "Around the World", by m.o.v.e from Electrock
 "Round the World", by Dannii Minogue from Club Disco

Sports and games
 Around the World (basketball), a basketball variant
 Around the World (football trick), a juggling skill in football (soccer)
 Around the world (card game), a drinking game
 Around the world, a trick performed with a Yo-yo

See also
Around the World in Eighty Days (disambiguation)
All Around the World (disambiguation)